Leonel Rodrigo Contreras Zúñiga (born 30 August 1961) is a Chilean former footballer.

References

1961 births
Living people
Association football defenders
Chilean footballers
Chile international footballers
Olympic footballers of Chile
Footballers at the 1984 Summer Olympics
1989 Copa América players
Everton de Viña del Mar footballers
Deportes La Serena footballers
Club Deportivo Universidad Católica footballers